Pind Di Kurhi, also spelled Pind Di Kudi or Pind Di Kuri, is a 1963 Punjabi film, directed by Baldev R. Jhingan, starring Ravinder Kapoor, Nishi, Wasti, Khairati, Maruti, Tun Tun and more.

Music 

Hansraj Behl composed the music for playback singers Mohammad Rafi, Lata Mangeshkar, Shamshad Begum, Asha Bhosle, Mahinder Kapoor, Minu Purshottam. Verma Malik penned the lyrics.

See also 
 Pind Di Kurhi (2005 film)

References 

Indian black-and-white films
Films set in Punjab, India
1963 films
Punjabi-language Indian films
1960s Punjabi-language films